Radu Leon Marginean (born 3 January 1983) is a Romanian former footballer who played in his career for teams such as: UTA Arad, Bihor Oradea, CFR Cluj and Gloria Bistriţa.

Career 
Marginean is on loan to Gloria until the summer of 2007 from CFR 1907 Cluj. Marginean was the captain of the under-21 Romania national team. He is a central defensive midfielder. During the summer of 2005 Marginean was badly injured and was out for most of the 2005–2006 season. He was loaned out to Gloria, but then he came back to CFR Cluj.

External links
 
 

1983 births
Living people
Romanian footballers
Association football midfielders
Liga I players
Liga II players
FC UTA Arad players
FC Bihor Oradea players
CFR Cluj players
ACF Gloria Bistrița players
Sportspeople from Arad, Romania